Tyszkiewicz Palace, also known as Tyszkiewicz–Potocki Palace, is a rebuilt palace at 32 Krakowskie Przedmieście in Warsaw, Poland. It is one of the most beautiful Neoclassical-style buildings in the city.

History
The original palace was built by  Ludwik Tyszkiewicz, a Field Hetman of Lithuania. Construction began in 1785, initially to plans by Stanisław Zawadzki, and was finished in 1792 in the Neoclassical style, to a design by Jan Chrystian Kamsetzer. In 1840, the palace was bought by the Potocki family.

During the interwar period, the building was home to Bank Gospodarstwa Krajowego and later to the Polish Academy of Literature. Burned in 1944, the palace was rebuilt after World War II and is now a property of Warsaw University.

The palace's relatively modest west façade, on Krakowskie Przedmieście, is embellished with some fine stuccowork. The central balcony is supported by four elegant stone Atlantes carved in 1787 by André Le Brun.

Gallery

See also
 Holy Cross Church
 Presidential Palace
 Kazimierz Palace

Notes

External links

  Pałac Tyszkiewiczów

Palaces in Warsaw
Houses completed in 1792
Neoclassical architecture in Warsaw
Rebuilt buildings and structures in Poland
University of Warsaw